, is a small island in Miyagi Prefecture in north-eastern Japan. It lies in the Pacific Ocean approximately one kilometer off the Oshika Peninsula.

Geography

It can be reached by ferry from Ishinomaki.

History
There is a shrine on the island, called Koganeyama-jinja, which dates from the 8th century.

References

External links

Tourist attractions in Miyagi Prefecture
Islands of Miyagi Prefecture
Ishinomaki